The Secretariat of the 25th Congress of the Communist Party of the Soviet Union (CPSU) was in session from 1976 to 1981.

Members

References

External links
 Politburo of the Communist Party of the Soviet Union (Узкий состав ЦК РСДРП(б) - Политическое бюро ЦК РСДРП(б) - Бюро ЦК РСДРП(б) - РКП(б) - Политическое бюро ЦК РКП(б) - ВКП(б) - Президиум - Политическое бюро ЦК КПСС). Handbook on History of the Communist Party and the Soviet Union 1898–1991.

Secretariat of the Central Committee of the Communist Party of the Soviet Union members
1976 establishments in the Soviet Union
1981 disestablishments in the Soviet Union